Matteo Manuguerra (5 October 1924 – 23 July 1998) was a Tunisian-born French baritone, one of the leading Verdi baritones of the 1970s.

Manuguerra was born in Tunis, Tunisia, to Italian parents, who later moved to Argentina. He came late to music, starting his vocal study at the age of 35, at the Buenos Aires Music Conservatory, with Umberto Landi. He made his debut as a tenor, in Mozart's Requiem. He settled in France in 1961, and after new studies, made his debut the following year as a baritone in the role of Valentin in Faust, at the Opéra de Lyon where he was to remain for three years.

Manuguerra made his Paris Opéra debut in 1966, as Rigoletto. He appeared throughout France, and sang on French radio particularly in Verdi operas such as, Nabucco, Ernani, I masnadieri, Luisa Miller, as well as in I vespri siciliani and Don Carlo, both in their original French versions.

After singing widely in Europe, Manuguerra made his American debut in 1968, as Gérard in Andrea Chénier, in Seattle. He made his Metropolitan Opera debut on 11 January 1971 as Enrico in Lucia di Lammermoor, other roles included Barnaba in La Gioconda,  Carlo in La forza del destino, Amonasro in Aida, Alfio in Cavalleria rusticana, Tonio in Pagliacci, and others. He also appeared at the San Francisco Opera and the Dallas Opera.

Manuguerra had a rich and supple voice enabling him to excel in both belcanto and verismo repertoire, with Verdi being always at the core, which his impressive discography clearly demonstrates.

Matteo Manuguerra enjoyed a long career and was still active when he died suddenly of a heart attack, in Montpellier, France.

Studio recordings 

 Rossini - Le barbier de Séville - Jean-Pierre Marty - EMI - 1974
 Bellini - I puritani - Riccardo Muti - EMI - 1979
 Verdi - Nabucco - Riccardo Muti - EMI - 1977-78
 Verdi - I masnadieri - Richard Bonynge - DECCA/LONDON - 1979
 Verdi - La battaglia di Legnano - Lamberto Gardelli - PHILLIPS - 1977
 Verdi - Stiffelio - Lamberto Gardelli - PHILLIPS - 1979
 Verdi - La traviata - Richard Bonynge - DECCA/LONDON - 1979
 Verdi - Otello - Alain Lombard - FORLANE - 1991
 Massenet - Werther - Michel Plasson - EMI - 1979
 Mascagni - Cavalleria rusticana - Riccardo Muti - EMI - 1979
 Puccini - La bohème - James Levine - EMI - 1979
 Puccini - Tosca - Mstislav Rostropovich - DEUTSCHE GRAMMOPHON - 1976
 Zandonai - Francesca da Rimini - Maurizio Arena - BALKATON - 1987

References

Sources 
 Dictionnaire des interprètes, Alain Pâris, Éditions Robert Laffont, 1989,  
 Guide de l’opéra, Roland Mancini & Jean-Jacques Rouveroux, Fayard, 1995, 

1924 births
1998 deaths
French operatic baritones
20th-century French male opera singers
French people of Italian descent
People from Tunis
Tunisian emigrants to Argentina
Argentine emigrants to France